Danil Yevgeniyevich Kapustyansky (born 30 October 2004) is a Russian football player. He plays as an attacking midfielder or winger for Orenburg.

Career
He made his debut in the Russian Premier League for Orenburg on 10 March 2023 in a game against Sochi.

References

External links
 
 
 

2004 births
People from Orenburg
Sportspeople from Orenburg Oblast
Living people
Russian footballers
Association football midfielders
FC Orenburg players
Russian Premier League players